Cabo Espichel is a cape situated on the western coast of the civil parish of Castelo, municipality of Sesimbra, in the Portuguese district of Setúbal.

History

Following the Chalcolithic, human tribes began to look for elevated locations in order provide a natural defense; there are vestiges encountered in the area of Outeiro Redondo and Zambujal, that indicate this preoccupation and conflicts. During the Iron Age, there are documented references to the lands of Risco, farther to the west of Cabo Espichel, that was a largest undefended settlement at the time. Avieno in Orla Marítima named Cabo Espichel, Cabo Cêmpsico, and was probably because the name was associated with the peoples that lived in the vicinity. Later, the geographer Strabo called this area Promontorium Barbaricum.

At a time when Roman settlement persisted in the Iberian peninsula, the Roman presence on the cape was limited. This can be explained by the symbology that the Romans conferred on the capes, which they considered sacred, where the gods met at night. Notwithstanding, there are vestiges of the Roman Imperial cult in the Lapa do Bugio, situated in Zambujal, close to Sesimbra.

Until today there have not been encountered any evidence of Muslim settlement, but the local toponymy has a few markers, such as the name Azóia, that derived from Al Zawiya (meaning hermitage). Some Moorish coins were also discovered in Lapa do Fumo (but minted in Silves) and some ceramics attributed to hermits from the Lapa do Forte do Cavalo and Lapa do Coelho. During the Middle Ages, various legends attracted people to the site; it was a crucible of Portuguese nationalism, when on 29 July 1180, in the square of Cabo Espichel, D. Fuas Roupinho was able to obtain the nation's first naval victory against the Moors.

There are various legends associated with the cult of Nossa Senhora da Cabo, many contradictory, that situate the devotion during this time. It is possible that the cult resulted from Christianization of other cults that appeared in the pre-history and continued to Moorish occupation. The cult, though, is certainly medieval dating from the 13th century, with the first references appearing in the 14th century (specifically in 1366) from a royal letter sent by King D. Pedro I.

Another medieval legend about the cape indicates that in 1215 a ship traveling to Lisbon was caught in a storm, tasking the crew. Haildebrat (the ships chaplain) decided to pray to an image, that he had in his cabin, but realized that it had disappeared. Desperate for divine intervention, they suddenly saw at the top of the cape a light, even during the height of the storm. Later, when they arrived on land, they encountered the disappeared image on the ship.

Geography

Cabo Espichel is situated on the western coast of Portugal, along an extension of approximately  that occupies a region called the Bacia Lusitânica (BL), that occurred during the opening of the north Atlantic during Triassic.

In tectonic terms, the BL is delimited by the Porto-Tomar fault and the Arrife-Vale fault in the eastern/lower Tagus and in the west by the Berlengas horst, corresponding to a ridge of intense tectonic subsistence along the north-northeast to south-southwest.

The southern limit is located at an elevation south of Arrábida (at the Arrábida fault) and the southern limit corresponds to the watershed transition situated more to the north. In addition to these faults, there are also faults with variable directions between east-west and northeast-southwest, that divide the basin into different tectonic-sedimentary areas, that could have influenced sediment deposition during Mesozoic. The BL is filled with sediments between the late Triassic and late Cretaceous, including alternating layers of marine carbonates, clastic carbonate coastal sediments, fluvial and estuarine siliciclastic deposits, among others.

Also famous, are the several dinosaur fossil trackways exposed in some of the now tilted Jurassic strata which form the cape's cliffs.  It is said that local superstition interpreted the trackways as the path taken by the Holy Virgin ("Nossa Senhora") when riding a giant mule from the ocean and up the cliffs, which led to the eventual construction of the convent at that location.

References

Notes

Sources
 
 

Espichel
Espichel
Fossil trackways
Geography of Setúbal District
Tourist attractions in Setúbal District